The second HMS Moorsom (K567) was a British Captain-class frigate of the Royal Navy in commission during World War II. Originally constructed as the United States Navy Evarts-class destroyer escort DE-522, she served in the Royal Navy from 1943 to 1945.

Construction and transfer
The ship was laid down as the unnamed U.S. Navy destroyer escort DE-522 by the Boston Navy Yard in Boston, Massachusetts, on 14 August 1943 and launched on 24 September 1943. The United States transferred her to the United Kingdom under Lend-Lease on 10 December 1943.

Service history
The ship was commissioned into service in the Royal Navy as HMS Moorsom (K567)  on 10 December 1943 simultaneously with her transfer. She served on convoy escort duty in the North Atlantic Ocean and the North Sea for the remainder of World War II. In addition, she supported the Allied invasion of Normandy in the summer of 1944.

After the conclusion of the war, Moorsom steamed to New York City, arriving there on 16 October 1945. The Royal Navy decommissioned her there on 25 October 1945 and returned her to the U.S. Navy the same day.

Disposal
After her return, Moorsom remained in the 3rd Naval District. The U.S. Navy struck her from its Naval Vessel Register on 5 December 1945 and soon sold her for scrapping, which was completed on 12 July 1946.

References

Navsource Online: Destroyer Escort Photo Archive DE 522 HMS Moorsom (K-567)
uboat.net HMS Moorsom (K 567)
Captain Class Frigate Association HMS Moorsom K567 (DE 522)

External links
 Photo gallery of HMS Moorsom (K567)

 

Captain-class frigates
Evarts-class destroyer escorts
World War II frigates of the United Kingdom
World War II frigates and destroyer escorts of the United States
Ships built in Boston
1943 ships